Circuito de Jerez – Ángel Nieto (formerly known as Circuit de Jerez and Circuito de Velocidad Jerez), is a  racing circuit located close to the city of Jerez de la Frontera,  south of Seville and deep within the sherry-producing region in the south of Spain. The project was led by the Spanish engineer Manuel Medina Lara, based on a preliminary idea from Alessandro Rocci.

Circuit history
The circuit opened on 8 December 1985. During 1986 the circuit hosted the first international motorcycle event in Spain in March and the Formula One Spanish Grand Prix in April. The circuit's relatively remote location hindered significant spectator turnout, although up to 125,000 can be accommodated.  Because of this, F1 moved to Barcelona following the 1991 race.

In 1992, the track eliminated four corners to create the long right hander Curva Sito Pons. Due to the hosting of the European Grand Prix in 1994, a new chicane was created (the Senna curve) at the corner where Martin Donnelly had a career-ending accident during qualifying for the 1990 Spanish Grand Prix. Jerez also hosted the 1997 European Grand Prix, which was the championship decider between Michael Schumacher and Jacques Villeneuve, who collided during the race.

During the podium celebrations of the 1997 race, Jerez's Mayor Pedro Pacheco disrupted the podium celebrations by presenting a trophy that was supposed to be presented by a dignitary from Daimler-Benz. This incident resulted in the track being temporarily banned from hosting a Grand Prix. It has not hosted another Grand Prix since, but continued to be used for winter testing until 2015.

During 2005, the track was resurfaced. It was expected that the Champ Car World Series would race there in 2008 until the series was cancelled early in the year after merging with the IndyCar Series.

On 2 May 2013, it was announced that the final corner would be renamed after Spanish then four-time and reigning world champion (250cc - 2006, 2007; MotoGP - 2010, 2012) Jorge Lorenzo.

In 2017, FIA Formula 2 hosted a stand-alone event on October 7 and 8 at the circuit.

On 3 May 2018, the circuit was renamed in honor of the former motorcyclist Ángel Nieto, who died in 2017.

On 3 May 2019, the sixth corner (formerly Curva Dry Sac) was renamed after Dani Pedrosa, retired three-time world champion (125cc - 2003; 250cc - 2004, 2005) and three-time runner-up in the MotoGP class.

Lap records
The all-time outright track record is 1:15.651, set by Pedro de la Rosa in a McLaren MP4-20, during Formula One testing in April 2005. The fastest official race lap records at the Circuito de Jerez are listed as:

Events

 Current

 February: GT Winter Series
 April: Grand Prix motorcycle racing Spanish motorcycle Grand Prix, Campeonato de España de Superbike
 June: FIM CEV Moto3 Junior World Championship, FIM CEV Moto2 European Championship
 September: Eurocup-3, F4 Spanish Championship, TCR Spain Campeonato de España de Superturismos
 October: Jerez Historic Festival, Campeonato de España de Superbike
 November: Campeonato de España de Resistencia

 Former

 BPR Global GT Series (1995)
 Euroformula Open Championship (2014–2018)
 Euroseries 3000 (2002–2004, 2008)
 FIA Formula 2 Championship (2017)
 FIM Endurance World Championship (1986–1987)
 Formula One
 European Grand Prix (1994, 1997)
 Spanish Grand Prix (1986–1990)
 GP3 Series (2017)
 Grand Prix motorcycle racing 
 Andalusian motorcycle Grand Prix (2020)
 Expo 92 motorcycle Grand Prix (1987)
 International Formula 3000 (1988–1991, 1997)
 International GT Open (2013–2014)
 Lamborghini Super Trofeo World Final (2019)
 MotoE World Cup Spanish eRace (2020–2022)
 Sidecar World Championship (1987–1988, 1990–1992)
 Superbike World Championship (1990, 2013–2017, 2019–2021)
 Superleague Formula (2008)
 TCR Europe Touring Car Series (2016)
 World Series Formula V8 3.5 (2014–2017)
 World Sportscar Championship (1986–1988)

Weather and climate
Jerez racetrack is located near the airport where the city's official weather station is located. The site has a hot-summer Mediterranean climate (Köppen Csa with mild and rainy winters coupled with hot summers with pronounced drought. As a result, all of Jerez' Formula One and MotoGP races have been held during shoulder seasons when the air temperatures normally are gentler. The current placement of the MotoGP event in early May has reduced rainfall risk compared to the previous April date, as well as raising the likely average temperature by several degrees. Formula One races used to be held in latter parts of the autumn, but were discontinued after 1997.

Jerez used to be a primary winter testing venue for Formula One and remains so for both MotoGP and the Superbike World Championship, in part due to the favourable temperatures in winter mimicking potential conditions during the race season farther north in Europe even in January.

Fatalities
Dean Berta Viñales, 15, Spanish motorcycle racer, crashed 25 September 2021.
Ismael Bonilla, 41, Spanish motorcycle racer, crashed 5 July 2020.
Nobuyuki Wakai, Japanese motorcycle racer, crashed 1 May 1993.

Notes

References

External links 

 

Formula One circuits
Grand Prix motorcycle circuits
Spanish Grand Prix
Motorsport venues in Andalusia
Superbike World Championship circuits
Buildings and structures in Jerez de la Frontera
Sports venues in Andalusia
Sport in Jerez de la Frontera